Lucas Diarte (born 4 June 1993) is an Argentine footballer who plays as a left-back for San Martín de Tucumán.

References

1993 births
Argentine footballers
Association football defenders
Estudiantes de La Plata footballers
Central Córdoba de Santiago del Estero footballers
San Martín de Tucumán footballers
Argentine Primera División players
Living people